The Bath Fugues is a 2009 novel by Australian novelist Brian Castro.

Plot summary

The Bath Fugues is a novel of three sections, all interconnecting and modelled on the structure of the Goldberg variations. The first section, "Beckett's Bicycle", tells the story of Jason Redvers, an art forger and writer. The second, "Walter's Brief", concerns Redvers's grandfather Camilo Conceicao, a Portuguese poet. The last, "Sarraute's Surgery", is set in and around Port Douglas in Queensland and features local GP, Judith Sarraute, who had been Redvers's doctor when she was still practising in Sydney.

Notes

Epigraph:

 The Goldberg Variations...are a set of 30 variations for harpsichord by Johann Sebastian Bach. First published in 1741...the work is considered to be one of the most important examples of variation form. It is named after Johann Gottlieb Goldberg, who may have been the first performer. Wikipedia
 It is, in short, music which observes neither end nor beginning, music with neither real climax nor real resolution, music which like Baudelaire's lovers rests lightly on the wings of the unchecked wind. Glenn Gould

Reviews
 The Sydney Morning Herald

Awards and nominations

 2010 shortlisted Festival Awards for Literature (SA) — Award for Fiction 
 2010 shortlisted Miles Franklin Literary Award 
 2010 shortlisted Queensland Premier's Literary Awards — Best Fiction Book 
 2010 shortlisted Victorian Premier's Literary Awards — The Vance Palmer Prize for Fiction

References 

2009 Australian novels
Novels set in Queensland
Giramondo Publishing books